Arūnas Bižokas  (born 29 January 1978 in Vilnius, Lithuania) is a professional Lithuanian ballroom dancer, who is currently representing the USA.

Until 2007 he was competing with his partner Edita Daniūtė under the Lithuanian flag at World DanceSport Federation recognized events, which is recognized as competitive dancing representing federation by the International Olympic Committee. In 2005 the couple won the World Games.

After 2007 Bižokas started to compete in the alternative World Dance Council rules events under the United States flag. His current partner is Katusha Demidova. As a couple they have won the 2009, 2010, 2011, 2012, 2013, 2014, 2015, 2016, 2017, 2018 and 2019 Professional World Ballroom Dance Championships in Standard Ballroom.  In 2013, Bižokas and his partner were ranked number one in the World Dance Council world ranking in the Professional Ballroom category.

Arunas and Katusha retired from competitive dancing in 2019.

References

External links
 Arunas and Katusha Website

Lithuanian ballroom dancers
Living people
Lithuanian male dancers
Dancers from Vilnius
1978 births
World Games gold medalists
World Games bronze medalists
Competitors at the 2001 World Games
Competitors at the 2005 World Games